Commercial Breakdown is an Australian light entertainment television program based on the British version of the same name that features humorous television advertisements from around the world. The show first aired on 24 September 2007, and had a first series run of six episodes. The show returned for a second series on 7 April 2009.

The show was placed on hiatus after the third episode of its second season. It is unknown if or when any remaining episodes will screen.

Hosts
The show is hosted by Darren McMullen, an MTV VJ who appears courtesy of MTV Australia. McMullen replaced the show's original host, former Australian rules footballer Dermott Brereton, after the first series.

 Dermott Brereton (2007)
 Darren McMullen (2009)

Episodes

Notes

References

External links
 Official website
 

Nine Network original programming
2007 Australian television series debuts
2009 Australian television series endings